Talakmau (also known as Talamau or Ophir) is a volcano in West Sumatra, Indonesia. Its elevation is 2,919 m (9,577 ft).

See also 
 List of volcanoes in Indonesia

External links 

Subduction volcanoes
Volcanoes of Sumatra
Mountains of Sumatra
Complex volcanoes
Landforms of West Sumatra